Altermann is a German surname. Notable people of the surname include the following:

 Karl-Heinz Altermann (1922-2013), German officer
 Theodor Altermann (1885–1915), Estonian actor, theatre producer and director

See also 
 "Alter Mann", a song by Rammstein from Sehnsucht
 Alterman

German-language surnames

de:Altermann